Alain Savary (25 April 191817 February 1988) was a French Socialist politician, deputy to the National Assembly of France during the Fourth and Fifth Republic, chairman of the Socialist Party (PS) and a government minister in the 1950s and in 1981–1984, when he was appointed by President François Mitterrand as Minister of National Education.

Life 

In 1940, as soon as France was occupied by the German army, Savary enlisted in the Resistance. He organized the rallying of Saint-Pierre et Miquelon to the Free French Forces and became its governor. After the war, he participated in the restoring of the Republican State.

A member of the French Section of the Workers' International (Socialist Party, SFIO) he was deputy for Saint-Pierre et Miquelon throughout most of the Fourth Republic, from 1944 to 1946 and from 1951 to 1958. In 1956, he was nominated Secretary of State for Foreign Affairs in Guy Mollet's cabinet, but resigned due to his opposition to the repressive policy of Mollet in Algerian War (1954–62) and to the arrest of Ahmed Ben Bella. He left the SFIO in 1958, because of the party's support for Charles de Gaulle's comeback and for the new Constitution elaborating a presidential regime (the Fifth Republic).

With Pierre Mendès France, he founded the dissident Autonomous Socialist Party (PSA) which became, in 1960, the Unified Socialist Party (PSU). However, he left it in 1967 and founded the Union of Clubs for the Renewal of the Left, which joined the Federation of the Democratic and Socialist Left (FGDS) which had supported left-wing candidate François Mitterrand at the 1965 presidential election. Then, he returned to the "old socialist house" when it was replaced by the Socialist Party (PS).

In the PS
Reconciled with Guy Mollet, Savary succeeded him to the leadership of the party in 1969. As First Secretary of the PS, he promised to begin an "ideological dialogue" with the French Communist Party (PCF), which was the largest left-wing party in France at the time. He was faced with growing pressure from internal opponents insisted that he remain dependent on Mollet's followers and not to pursue the "renewal" of the party. Two years later, during the Épinay Congress, he was removed by François Mitterrand, who proposed an alliance with the Communists based on a Common Program.

Savary became a Deputy for Haute-Garonne in 1973. In 1981 he became Minister of National Education under President François Mitterrand. As minister of education, Savary appointed a series of charges de missions and study commissions to survey problems and propose possible remedies in a variety of areas: the Jeantet Commission on higher education, the Prost Coommissin on the lycees, the Legrand Commission on the colleges, Bertrand Schwartz on the educational and employment problems of 16- to 18-year-olds, Andre Peretti on training of elementary and secondary school teachers, Jean-Louis Quermonne on the status of teachers in higher education, and Laurent Schwartz and the Commission du Bilan on the educational system as a whole.

In June 1984, Mitterrand decided to withdraw the "Savary Bill" to limit the financing of private schools due to large demonstrations by the supporters of private schools. Savary resigned in July 1984.  At the same time the government of Prime Minister Pierre Mauroy was replaced by a new government led by Laurent Fabius.
He retired from government at this point and held no further offices prior to his death at age 69.

References

 

1918 births
1988 deaths
People from Algiers
People of French Algeria
Pieds-Noirs
French Section of the Workers' International politicians
Unified Socialist Party (France) politicians
Chairmen of the Socialist Party (France)
French Ministers of National Education
Lycée Buffon alumni
Deputies of the 2nd National Assembly of the French Fourth Republic
Deputies of the 3rd National Assembly of the French Fourth Republic
Deputies of the 1st National Assembly of the French Fifth Republic
Deputies of the 5th National Assembly of the French Fifth Republic
Deputies of the 6th National Assembly of the French Fifth Republic
Deputies of the 7th National Assembly of the French Fifth Republic
Free French Forces
Members of Parliament for Saint-Pierre-et-Miquelon